NetFoss is a popular Network FOSSIL driver for Windows.
A FOSSIL is a serial communications layer to allow DOS based software to talk to modems without dealing with hardware I/O and interrupts.

A Network FOSSIL redirects such software to a TCP/IP address rather than to a serial modem.
NetFoss is faster than other FOSSIL drivers, due to being written in 32-bit assembly language.
It allows Zmodem transfers at up to 280,000 CPS.

NetFoss was developed in 2001 by pcmicro, and was released as freeware. Several minor updates have been released since then. The current version can be downloaded from http://netfoss.com.

References
 NetFoss Users Guide
 FOSSIL implementation and use, FidoNet Technical Standards Committee
 Interfacing to a FOSSIL Communication Driver, Dr. Dobb's Journal 
 The BBS FAQ, Chapter 6.09: FOSSIL DRIVERS

External links
 http://netfoss.com

FOSSIL

sv:Fido Opus Seadog Standard Interface Layer
zh:FOSSIL